Five Roses may refer to:

Five Roses (album), by Miracle Fortress, 2007
Five Roses Flour, a Canadian brand